Knox Township is one of twenty-one townships in Knox County, Illinois, USA.  As of the 2010 census, its population was 5,027 and it contained 2,147 housing units.

Geography

Cities, towns, villages
 East Galesburg
 Knoxville

Cemeteries
The township contains these seven cemeteries: Alms House, Butterfield Family, Knoxville, Saint Marys, Swedish, Union and Van Gilder.

Demographics

School districts
 Galesburg Community Unit School District 205
 Knoxville Community Unit School District 202
 Abingdon-Avon Unit School District

Political districts
 Illinois's 17th congressional district
 State House District 74
 State Senate District 37

References

External links
 City-Data.com
 Illinois State Archives
 Township Officials of Illinois
 United States Census Bureau 2009 TIGER/Line Shapefiles
 United States National Atlas

Townships in Knox County, Illinois
Galesburg, Illinois micropolitan area
Townships in Illinois